Vladimír Novák (February 2, 1904 – April 28, 1986) was a Czechoslovakian Nordic skier who competed in the 1920s and in the 1930s. He won a silver medal in the 4 x 10 km at the 1933 FIS Nordic World Ski Championships in Innsbruck.

At the 1928 Winter Olympics he finished twelfth in the 18 kilometre cross-country skiing event.

Four years later Novak finished 11th in the 50 kilometre event and 14th in the shorter cross-country skiing event at the 1932 Winter Olympics in Lake Placid, New York.

References

External links
Winter Olympic 18 km results: 1924-32
Winter Olympic 50 km results: 1924-32

1904 births
1986 deaths
Czech male cross-country skiers
Czechoslovak male cross-country skiers
Olympic cross-country skiers of Czechoslovakia
Cross-country skiers at the 1928 Winter Olympics
Cross-country skiers at the 1932 Winter Olympics
Cross-country skiers at the 1936 Winter Olympics
FIS Nordic World Ski Championships medalists in cross-country skiing